Dion Joseph Nash (born 20 November 1971) is a New Zealand entrepreneur and former cricketer. He played for the New Zealand cricket team, captaining the team in 1999 with the injury of regular captain Stephen Fleming. Nash was a right-arm fast medium bowler, taking 93 Test wickets in a career spanning from 1992 to 2001. He became the first player in history to take ten wickets and score 50 runs in a match at the Lord's ground in 1994.

Suspension
On the 1995 tour to South Africa, Nash was suspended for smoking cannabis along with future captain Stephen Fleming and team-mate Matthew Hart.

Beyond cricket
In June 2005, Nash was named as one of the national selectors. In 2008 he became a batsman/bowler for the official New Zealand Beach Cricket Team.

Nash also played Australian rules football in the Auckland Australian Football League, where he was a premiership player with the Mt Roskill Saints.

Triumph & Disaster
After retiring from cricket, Nash was a salesman for spring water brand 420, and held a 25% stake in the water business, before Bacardi bought the parent vodka brand 42 Below. He then founded skincare brand Triumph & Disaster in 2011, seeing a lack of moisturisers aimed at men. He himself had used Oil of Olay during his cricket days, to some derision. Nash describes increasing acceptance of men's skincare as part of a modern expansion of masculine norms.

The brand name is from Rudyard Kipling's poem "If—", which includes the line "If you can meet with Triumph and Disaster/And treat those two impostors just the same". When Nash was about 13 years old, his father gave him a framed copy of the poem, which is written as advice from a father to his son.

The brand, which features natural ingredients from the South Pacific, aims to be sustainable and minimize pollution, and sells in luxury department stores such as Selfridges, Liberty's of London, Harvey Nichols, and hundreds of other retailers worldwide.

Personal life
He is married to former New Zealand netballer Bernice Mene; together they have three children.

He attended Dargaville High School before completing his final year of school as a boarder at Auckland Grammar.

See also
List of Middlesex County Cricket Club List A cricketers#N

References

External links

Triumph & Disaster

1971 births
Living people
Auckland cricketers
Middlesex cricketers
New Zealand One Day International captains
New Zealand Test cricket captains
Commonwealth Games bronze medallists for New Zealand
Northern Districts cricketers
Otago cricketers
Doping cases in cricket
New Zealand national cricket team selectors
People educated at Dargaville High School
Commonwealth Games medallists in cricket
Cricketers at the 1998 Commonwealth Games
People educated at Auckland Grammar School
South Island cricketers
Medallists at the 1998 Commonwealth Games